Sydney Hollands (24 January 1866 – 28 April 1949) was an English cricketer.  Hollands' batting and bowling styles are unknown.  He was born at East Grinstead, Sussex.

Hollands made his first-class debut for Sussex against the Marylebone Cricket Club at Lord's in 1887.  He made ten further first-class appearances for the county, the last of which came against Yorkshire in the 1893 County Championship.  In his eleven matches, he scored a total of 154 runs at an average of 7.33, with a high score of 21.

He died at Croydon, Surrey on 28 April 1949.

References

External links
Sydney Hollands at ESPNcricinfo
Sydney Hollands at CricketArchive

1866 births
1949 deaths
People from East Grinstead
English cricketers
Sussex cricketers